Frank Vaughan is the name of:
 Frankie Vaughan (1928–1999), British singer
 Frank Vaughn (1902–1959), US soccer player
 Frank Vaughan (rugby league) (1918–2014), National Rugby League player